The Serb National Guard of Kotor (Serbian Latin: Srpska narodna garda Kotora, Cyrillic: Српска народна гарда Которa) was an armed Serb institution in the Gulf of Kotor, founded in 1862. It existed for over 50 years.

References

External links
Serb National Guard of Kotor

Military history of Montenegro
Coast guards
1862 establishments in Montenegro